The Gura Slănic mine is a large salt mine located in eastern Romania in Bacău County, close to Târgu Ocna. Gura Slănic represents one of the largest salt reserves in Romania having estimated reserves of 1 billion tonnes of NaCl.

References 

Salt mines in Romania